Chondracanthus is a parasitic copepod genus in the family Chondracanthidae, containing the following species:

Chondracanthus australis Ho, 1991
Chondracanthus barnardi Ho, 1972
Chondracanthus brotulae Capart, 1959
Chondracanthus colligens Barnard, 1955
Chondracanthus cottunculi Rathbun, 1886
Chondracanthus deltoideus Fraser, 1920
Chondracanthus distortus C. B. Wilson, 1922
Chondracanthus genypteri G. M. Thomson, 1890
Chondracanthus goldsmidi Tang, Andrews & Cobcroft, 2007
Chondracanthus gracilis Fraser, 1920
Chondracanthus heterostichi Ho, 1972
Chondracanthus horridus Heller, 1865
Chondracanthus irregularis Fraser, 1920
Chondracanthus janebennettae Causey, 1953
Chondracanthus lepidionis Kabata, 1970
Chondracanthus lepophidii Ho, 1974
Chondracanthus lophii Johnston, 1836
Chondracanthus merluccii (Holten, 1802)
Chondracanthus multituberculatus (Markevich, 1956)
Chondracanthus narium Kabata, 1969
Chondracanthus neali Leigh-Sharpe, 1930
Chondracanthus nodosus (O. F. Müller, 1776)
Chondracanthus ornatus T. Scott, 1900
Chondracanthus palpifer C. B. Wilson, 1912
Chondracanthus pinguis C. B. Wilson, 1912
Chondracanthus polymixiae Yamaguti, 1939
Chondracanthus psetti Kroyer, 1863
Chondracanthus pusillus Kabata, 1968
Chondracanthus shiinoi Yamaguti, 1963
Chondracanthus solidus (Gusev, 1951)
Chondracanthus theragrae Yamaguti, 1939
Chondracanthus triventricosus Sekerak, 1970
Chondracanthus tuberculatus Nordmann, 1832
Chondracanthus wilsoni Ho, 1971
Chondracanthus yabei J. S. Ho, I.H. Kim & Nagasawa, 2005
Chondracanthus yanezi Atria, 1980
Chondracanthus zei Delaroche, 1811

References 

Poecilostomatoida
Copepod genera
Taxa named by François-Étienne de La Roche